Martta Martikainen-Ypyä (September 19, 1904 – December 17, 1992) was a Finnish architect.

From 1928 to 1936, she was architect for office buildings for the Finnish Ministry of Defence. She graduated from the Helsinki University of Technology in 1932.

In 1936, she married architect . The couple formed an architectural firm in Vyborg; in 1939, they moved to Helsinki. Following World War II, she worked in the housing production office of Hyresgästernas Sparkasse- och Byggnadslånebyrån (HSB) in Stockholm, becoming department head. Martikainen-Ypyä, by herself or in partnership with her husband, won a number or architectural competitions and also designed many hospitals, schools, factories, office building and housing projects.

Martikainen-Ypyä died in Helsinki at the age of 88.

References 

1904 births
1992 deaths
Finnish women architects